The 2022 KPMG Women's PGA Championship was the 68th Women's PGA Championship, played June 23–26, 2022 at Congressional Country Club in Bethesda, Maryland. It was won by Chun In-gee with an aggregate of 283, five under par. She finished one stroke ahead of Lexi Thompson and Minjee Lee.

Round summaries

First round
Thursday, June 23, 2022

Second round
Friday, June 24, 2022

Third round
Saturday, June 25, 2022

Final round
Sunday, June 26, 2022

References

External links
KPMG Women's PGA Championship Leaderboard

Women's PGA Championship
Golf in Maryland
Women's PGA Championship
Women's PGA Championship
Women's PGA Championship
Women's PGA Championship